Martinikerk may refer to one of several churches in the Netherlands:

 Martinikerk (Bolsward)
 Martinikerk (Doesburg)
 Martinikerk (Easterein), Easterein
 Martinikerk (Franeker), Franeker
 Martinikerk (Groningen)
 Martinikerk (Sneek), Sneek

Other uses
 Martinikerk Rondeau, a documentary

See also
 St. Martin's Cathedral, Utrecht
 St. Martin's Church (disambiguation)